Following the break-up of Czechoslovakia in 1993, the successor states, the Czech Republic and Slovakia, continued to share the 42 country code until 28 February 1997, with the Czech Republic then adopting 420 and Slovakia adopting 421.

On September 22, 2002, the Czech Republic adopted a closed numbering plan, with nine-digit numbers used for local and national calls, and the dropping of the trunk code 0.

Before the change, the following arrangements would have been made for calls to Brno:

 Local call:         xx xx xx xx
 National call:      05/xx xx xx xx
 International call: +420 5 xx xx xx xx

After the change, the dialing arrangements for calls to Brno were as follows:

 Within Czech Republic:  5xx xxx xxx
 Outside Czech Republic: +420 5xx xxx xxx

In the case of mobile numbers, which had to be dialed in full, the only change was that the 0 was no longer used:

 Within Czech Republic:  602 xxx xxx 
 Outside Czech Republic: +420 602 xxx xxx

Emergency calls (always toll-free)
 General emergency: 112
 Ambulance: 155
 Police: 158
 Fire brigade: 150
 Municipal police: 156
Other Emergency Numbers:
 Urgent gas leak: 1239
 Emergency Road Service (ABA): 1240
 Emergency Road Service (UAMK): 1230

Services Numbers 
O2 offers several over-the-phone information services for a fee. Note that many of the services are offered only in Czech:

 Info Line (Czech Number Directory): 1180
 Info Line (Foreign Number Directory): 1181
 Operator for changed numbers (re-numbering): 141 11
 Information on air quality: 141 10
 Exact time: 141 12
 Weather: 141 16
 Medical Information: 141 20
 Operator for international phone calls: 133 003

Prefixes
The first 1-3 digits (after +420) of the telephone number indicates location or network. For mobile phones, since there is number portability, the mobile phone code only indicates the original operator. For example, when a person calls a number starting with 73 (T-Mobile) but had been ported to another operator, a short voice message in Czech and English is played stating "you are calling out of a T-Mobile network" before the ringing tone. It is possible to disable this voice message.

Geographical

Mobile networks
   601 xxx xxx
   602 xxx xxx
   603 xxx xxx
   604 xxx xxx
   605 xxx xxx
   606 xxx xxx
   607 xxx xxx
   608 xxx xxx
   702 xxx xxx
   703 xxx xxx
   704 xxx xxx
   705 xxx xxx
   72x xxx xxx
   730 xxx xxx
   731 xxx xxx
   732 xxx xxx
   733 xxx xxx
   734 xxx xxx
   735 xxx xxx
   736 xxx xxx
   737 xxx xxx
   738 xxx xxx
   739 xxx xxx
   770 xxx xxx
   771 xxx xxx
   772 xxx xxx
   773 xxx xxx
   774 xxx xxx
   775 xxx xxx
   776 xxx xxx
   778 xxx xxx
   779 xxx xxx
   790 xxx xxx
   791 xxx xxx
   792 xxx xxx
   793 xxx xxx
   794 xxx xxx
   797 xxx xxx
   799 xxx xxx
601 - O2 Czech Republic (formerly NMT, numbers were ported to GSM in 2006; also used as part of the PPP log-in when dialling in the CDMA network) (formerly named EuroTel)
602 - O2 Czech Republic (GSM system)
603 - T-Mobile (formerly named Paegas/RadioMobil)
604 - T-Mobile
605 - T-Mobile
606 - O2 Czech Republic
607 - O2 Czech Republic
608 - Vodafone Czech Republic (formerly named Oskar)
70 - (formerly Bleskmobil's range)
72 - O2 Czech Republic
73 - T-Mobile
77 - Vodafone Czech Republic
790 - U:Fon (Mobilkom)
910 - VoIP non-geographic networks

Non-geographic networks
910 - VoIP

Institutional networks
These prefixes belong to the following networks:
9522 - Všeobecná zdravotní pojišťovna, government-controlled health insurance company
9555 - Bank "Komerční banka (KB)", a part of the Société Générale (SG) international group, formerly government-controlled company
9567 - Bank "Česká spořitelna (ČS)", a part of the Erste Bank Group, formerly government-controlled company
972 - Czech Railways and Railway Administration
973 - Ministry of Defence & Armed Forces of the Czech Republic
974 - Ministry of the Interior

Special pricing
800 - Zelená linka ("Green line") - toll-free (800 00 - Home Country Direct)
844 (also 81, 83, 843, 845, 846, 855) - Modrá linka (Blue line) - local call tariff from all Czech landlines
840 (also 841, 842, 847, 848, 849) - Bílá linka (White line) - national call tariff from all Czech landlines
90 - premium tariff
971 - dial-up internet access
976 xx - premium-priced dial-up internet access (priced at CZK xx per minute)

References

117/2007 Vyhláška o číslovacích plánech sítí a služeb elektronických komunikací 

Czech Republic
Czech Republic communications-related lists
Telecommunications in the Czech Republic